El Juicio de Dios is a 1979 Argentine drama film directed by Hugo Fili.

Cast
Horacio Bruno
Jorge De La Riestra
Ángel Magaña
Alba Múgica
Hugo Mújica
Romualdo Quiroga
Abel Sáenz Buhr
Jorge Velurtas

References

External links
 

1979 films
Argentine drama films
1970s Spanish-language films
1970s Argentine films